Alabama is a state located in the Southern United States. According to the 2020 United States Census, Alabama is the 24th most populous state with 5,024,279 inhabitants and the 28th largest by land area spanning  of land. Alabama is divided into 67 counties and contains 461 municipalities consisting of 174 cities and 287 towns.

The Code of Alabama 1975 defines the legal use of the terms "town" and "city" based on population.  A municipality with a population of 2,000 or more is a city, while less than 2,000 is a town. For legislative purposes, municipalities are divided into eight classes based on the municipality's population, as certified by the 1970 federal decennial census. The class of a municipality does not change if its population increases or decreases since the population figures refer to the 1970 federal census. Any municipality incorporated after June 28, 1979 is placed in a class according to the population of the municipality at the time of its incorporation. Class 1 is defined as all cities with a population of at least 300,000, as of the 1970 census. Birmingham is the state's only Class 1 municipality. Class 2 are cities between 175,000 and 299,999 inhabitants, as of the 1970 census. Mobile is the state's only Class 2 municipality. Montgomery and Huntsville are Class 3 municipalities. Class 3 cities are those with populations between 100,000 and 174,999 inhabitants, as of the 1970 census. Tuscaloosa and Gadsden are Class 4 cities with between 50,000 and 99,999 inhabitants, as of the 1970 census. Class 5 are cities with a population greater than 25,000 and less than 49,999. Class 6 are those with between 12,000 and 24,999 inhabitants, and Class 7 are cities with a population from 6,000 to 11,999 inhabitants. Class 8 includes all towns, plus all remaining cities with populations of less than 6,000.

The largest municipality by population is Huntsville with 215,006 residents while the smallest by population is Oak Hill with 14 residents.

List of cities and towns

See also

List of census-designated places in Alabama
List of unincorporated communities in Alabama
List of ghost towns in Alabama
List of place names in Alabama of Native American origin
List of settlement nicknames in Alabama
Alabama census statistical areas

Notes

References

Alabama
Municipalities
Alabama